Dundalk (  or  ) is an unincorporated community and census-designated place in Baltimore County, Maryland, United States. The population was 67,796 at the 2020 census. In 1960 and 1970, Dundalk was the largest unincorporated community in Maryland. It was named after the town of Dundalk, Ireland.  Dundalk is considered one of the first inner-ring suburbs of Baltimore.

History
The area now known as Dundalk was first explored by John Smith in 1608. Up until this time, the area had been occupied by the tribes of the Susquehannock.

In 1856 Henry McShane, an immigrant from Ireland, established the McShane Bell Foundry on the banks of the Patapsco River in the then far southeastern outskirts of Baltimore. The foundry later relocated to the Patterson Park area of Baltimore until a fire during the 1940s caused it to move to 201 East Federal Street. In addition to bronze bells, the foundry once manufactured cast iron pipes and furnace fittings. When asked by the Baltimore and Sparrows Point Railroad for a name of a depot for the foundry, which was on their rail line, McShane wrote Dundalk, after the town of his birth, Dundalk, Ireland. In 1977 the foundry moved to its current location in Glen Burnie.

In 1916 the Bethlehem Steel purchased  of farmland, near the McShane foundry, to develop housing for its shipyard workers. The Dundalk Company was formed to plan a town in the new style, similar to that of the Roland Park area of Baltimore, excluding businesses except at specific spots and leaving land for future development of schools, playing fields, and parks. By 1917 Dundalk proper was founded, at which point it had 62 houses, two stores, a post office, and a telephone exchange.  Streets were laid out in a pedestrian-friendly open grid, with monikers like "Shipway", "Northship", "Flagship", and "Admiral".  The two-story houses had steeply pitched roofs and stucco exteriors. As the demand for steel increased rapidly during World War 1, white workers streamed into Dundalk, pushing black workers into a small community nearby named Turner Station. Turner Station expanded even more during World War II as demand for steel increased even more.

Dundalk was once known as a "Little Appalachia" or a "hillbilly ghetto." Before, during, and after World War II many Appalachian migrants settled in the Baltimore area, including Dundalk. Appalachian people who migrated to Dundalk were largely economic migrants who came looking for work.

The Dundalk Historic District was listed on the National Register of Historic Places in 1983.

Geography

Most of Dundalk is flat and very near sea level, with a few small hills close to the city of Baltimore to the west. Dundalk is part of the Atlantic Coastal Plain.

Bread and Cheese Creek is a tributary of the Back River in Dundalk. It flows through Dundalk before emptying into the Back River, which flows into the Chesapeake Bay.

Demographics

As of the census of 2010, there were about 63,597 people. The racial makeup of Dundalk was about 79.9% white, 13.0% African American, 3.0% Hispanic, 1.0% Asian, and 3.1% all other.

There were 24,772 households, out of which 29.2% had children under the age of 18 living with them, 46.5% were married couples living together, 16.1% had a female householder with no husband present, and 31.5% were non-families. 26.4% of all households were made up of individuals, and 13.0% had someone living alone who was 65 years of age or older. The average household size was 2.50 and the average family size was 2.98.

In the CDP, the population was spread out, with 23.9% under the age of 18, 7.4% from 18 to 24, 28.4% from 25 to 44, 22.6% from 45 to 64, and 17.7% who were 65 years of age or older. The median age was 39 years. For every 100 females, there were 91.3 males. For every 100 females age 18 and over, there were 87.4 males.

The median income for a household in the CDP was $39,789, and the median income for a family was $46,035. Males had a median income of $36,512 versus $25,964 for females. The per capita income for the CDP was $18,543. About 6.6% of families and 9.2% of the population were below the poverty line, including 13.3% of those under age 18 and 6.9% of those age 65 or over.

Transportation

Roads
Some of the major roads in the Dundalk area are:
Dundalk Avenue
Eastern Avenue
Holabird Avenue
Merritt Boulevard
North Point Boulevard
Sollers Point Road
Wise Avenue

Public transit
Public transportation between Sparrows Point, Dundalk and Baltimore City was operated by the United Railways and Electric Company's (later the Baltimore Transit Company) #26 streetcar line which ran down the middle of Dundalk Avenue until August 1958.  Until the early 1950s, the line carried the famous "Red Rocket" streetcars which were two and three car trains of wooden trolleys.  During World War II's rush hours on the line, trains operated on a 30-second headway.

Between 1940 and 1972, bus service in the Dundalk area was provided by Dundalk Bus Lines.

Today, public transportation is provided by the Maryland Transit Administration. MTA lines that serve the area are CityLink Blue, CityLink Navy, CityLink Orange, LocalLink 59, LocalLink 62, LocalLink 63, Express BusLink 163 and LocalLink 65.

Education

Dundalk contains a campus of the Community College of Baltimore County, known as CCBC-Dundalk. It was formerly known as Dundalk Community College.

For primary and secondary education Dundalk is served by the Baltimore County Public Schools system, with Dundalk High School, Patapsco High School, and Sparrows Point High School being the major high schools to serve the area. Dundalk is also home to Sollers Point Technical High School, one of the only high schools in the country to hold an ISO 9001 certification.

Emergency services
Dundalk is under jurisdiction of Baltimore County Police Department, Dundalk (Precinct 12), which is located at 428 Westham Way.

There are multiple fire stations serving within the Dundalk area.
Dundalk Station 6
Eastview Station 15
Edgemere Station 9
Sparrows Point Station 57
North Point-Edgemere Vol. Station 26 
Wise Avenue Vol. Station 27

Support organizations 
 Dundalk Renaissance Corporation (nonprofit community development corporation) 
 Living With Grace (nonprofit that helps senior women on fixed income to obtain needed medical supplies)

Notable people
 "Nasty" Nestor Aparicio, sports writer and radio talk show host, radio station owner
 Joshua Barney, United States Navy commodore during the Revolutionary War and the War of 1812
 Mike Bielecki, former Major League Baseball pitcher
 Kevin Clash, native and resident of Dundalk's Turner Station neighborhood; performs Elmo and other Muppet characters
 Robert Curbeam, native of Turner Station neighborhood, NASA astronaut
 Ron Franklin, jockey who won the Kentucky Derby and Preakness Stakes aboard Spectacular Bid in 1979
 Rudy Gay, resident of Turner Station neighborhood; NBA player, former UConn and Archbishop Spaulding star
 Wild Bill Hagy, notable Baltimore Orioles fan
 Calvin Hill, resident of Turner Station neighborhood; NFL running back, father of NBA star Grant Hill
 Jim Jagielski, open-source founder and software engineer
 Dave Johnson, former Major League Baseball pitcher
 Henrietta Lacks, resident of Turner Station neighborhood; source of the HeLa cell line
 Bucky Lasek, professional skateboarder  and race car driver
 Tom Maxwell, guitarist/songwriter for rock band Hellyeah
 Douglas Purviance, Turner Station native, Grammy-winning jazz trombonist
 Gina Schock, drummer for The Go-Go's
 Tony Sweet, nature photographer, jazz musician
 John Thanos, spree killer
 Jessica Williams, jazz pianist. 
 Danny Wiseman, professional bowler with 12 PBA titles including the 2004 USBC Masters
 Bernie Wrightson, illustrator, known for his horror illustrations and comic books

See also
 The Dundalk Eagle newspaper

References

Bibliography
Neidt, C. (2006). "Gentrification and grassroots: Popular support in the revanchist suburb". Journal of Urban Affairs, Vol. 28, No. 2, 99–120.
Reutter, M. (2004). Making Steel: Sparrows Point and the Rise and Ruin of American Industrial Might. Urbana and Chicago: University of Illinois Press.
Rudacille, Deborah (2010). Roots of Steel: Boom and Bust in an American Mill Town. Pantheon. 
Vicino, Thomas, J. (2008). Transforming Race and Class in Suburbia: Decline in Metropolitan Baltimore. New York: Palgrave Macmillan.

External links

 http://dundalk.patch.com/  [online news and information community]
 Dundalk Chamber of Commerce
 Dundalk Renaissance Corporation

 
Appalachian culture in Maryland
Census-designated places in Maryland
Census-designated places in Baltimore County, Maryland
Irish-American culture in Maryland
Maryland populated places on the Chesapeake Bay